Janów Forests Landscape Park, (Polish: Park Krajobrazowy Lasy Janowskie), is a Polish Landscape Park designated protected area in southeastern Poland.

Geography
The park is within two Polish voivodeships, in northeastern Podkarpackie Voivodeship (Subcarpathian Voivodeship) and southwestern Lublin Voivodeship.  It is located north of Rzeszów and south of Lublin.

It was established in 1984.

Janów Forests Landscape Park is a Natura 2000 EU Special Protection Area.

Features
The park's forest landscape is varied, with meandering rivers and streams, meadows, and dune embankments. In drainless depressions with water flow there are vast swamps and peat bogs.

Visitor attractions include cycling, horseback riding, fishing, and Polish folk culture places and events.

The Puszcza Solska Landscape Park is also in the area.

Ponds and wetlands
They are 150 years old, with many built on natural swamps, taking advantage of the underground geological formations.

The Imielty Ług nature reserve is at one of the pond complexes within Janów Forests Landscape Park.

See also

Special Protection Areas in Poland

References

External links
 —Poland's Official Travel Website: Janowskie Forest Landscape Park webpage

Landscape parks in Poland
Parks in Lublin Voivodeship
Parks in Podkarpackie Voivodeship
Forests of Poland
Wetlands of Poland
Natura 2000 in Poland
Lubaczów County
1984 establishments in Poland
Protected areas established in 1984